Jason Dark is the 'nom de plume' of Helmut Rellergerd, a prolific author of horror detective fiction in the German language. His work has been favourably compared to that of Sir Arthur Conan Doyle.

Helmut Rellergerd

Helmut Rellergerd (born January 25, 1945 in Altena-Dahle, Sauerland) is a German writer, under the pseudonym of Jason Dark. Jason Dark is one of the most read authors in Germany in his genre.

Helmut Rellergerd was born in 1945 in Dahle, the Sauerland and grew up in Dortmund. He and wrote his first novel after he had finished school and the Bundeswehr. However, this debut release was rejected by the publishers. The first novel published at Bastei Publishing House was Im Kreuzfeuer des Todesdrachen in the crime series Cliff Corner. He wrote the 1973 novel Die Nacht des Hexers and created the fictional character John Sinclair. The Adventures of the English hero appear in the Bastei-Verlag in book and paperback form and developed from the 1970s to the most successful German horror series. Since the 1980s the John Sinclair radio play Since the 1980s, runs the successful radio play runs. Many novels have been translated into other languages.

Beyond the success of the John Sinclair series, Rellergerd invented other horror fiction series like Professor Zamorra and Damona King. Under the pseudonym Red Geller he wrote the youth book series Das Schloß-Trio. Since 2006 he has written under his pseudonym for the Blanvalet Publishing House the crime fiction series Don Harris Psycho-Cop.

Rellergerd lives in a district of Bergisch Gladbach.

John Sinclair 

From 1973, Jason Dark started publishing horror detective stories of the pulp fiction variety, centred on an English Scotland Yard inspector named John Sinclair. The latter's surname was inspired by the "Sinclair" character played by Roger Moore in the popular 1970s TV series, The Persuaders. The stories (usually of around 63 pages in length) have mostly been published as pulp magazines and have now reached the astonishing number of nearly 2,000 separate novels. The plots generally entail Inspector Sinclair's fighting against the forces of darkness (vampires, werewolves, sorcerers, zombies, etc.) and vanquishing them at the end of each tale. This positive disposition of the narratives has, Helmut Rellergerd believes, helped explain the popularity of the books, particularly amongst women, who (according to Rellergerd in a recorded radio interview) appear to number the most enthusiastic and largest group of his readers, not least because the stories are not excessively violent, but display a certain humanity.

The name of "Jason Dark" has humorous origins: Rellergerd's wife had a particular dislike for the fictitious English private investigator, Jason King, of the TV series of that name, and as a slightly malicious joke, Rellergerd decided to give his central character precisely the name of "Jason". The surname, "Dark", suggested itself quite naturally, as his hero constantly does battle against dark forces.

Jason Dark also writes other pulp fiction, focussing on his character "Psycho-Cop". He continues to write three or four novels a month and shows no sign of losing his inventive vigour—a creativity that borders on the realms of genius. While unlikely to merit the title of a "Dichter" (poet, or serious writer),  he is perhaps best described in his own words as a "kreativer Beamte" (creative bureaucrat, clerk or civil servant), producing (on an old-fashioned manual typewriter) novel after novel for his employers, Bastei Verlag (Bastei Publishers).

Jason Dark has become, and remains, a pulp-author phenomenon in what the Germans term "Trivialliteratur", but which less generous commentators might call "trash fiction". Yet despite the speed with which the novels are written, they are marked by a certain skill in construction, a richness of vocabulary, a facility for devising gripping plot lines, and an eloquence in style which make them of some literary interest in their specific field. Indeed, Jason Dark has been called a 'writer of genius' and a 'remarkable literary phenomenon' by literary scholar, Dr. Tony Page, who also points out how Dark has been favourably compared to Sir Arthur Conan Doyle: 'Jason Dark’s imaginative powers have rightly been praised. Indeed, Godden writes: "‘As regards imagination, Jason Dark towers houses high in superiority above Sherlock Holmes creator, Conon (sic!) Doyle.’ (Godden, 207: 293). This is eminent praise indeed - and is justly bestowed'.

Views on writing and politics 

Helmut Rellergerd has claimed (in the same recorded interview alluded to above) that many people have found his novels to be psychologically and emotionally beneficial, particularly during times of illness (saying that they have contributed to the recovery process through John Sinclair's "optimistic attitude" to life). In this, one might link him to Austrian writer Adalbert Stifter, who specifically recommended his novel, Der Nachsommer, as a therapeutic tool for the overcoming of melancholia or depression.

When asked in 2006 what caused him, the famed horror writer, the greatest fear and horror, he replied that it was George W. Bush's activities, particularly in Iraq: these called forth veritable goosebumps of fright upon his skin, he said.

Publications (selection) 
 John Sinclair
 Das Schloß-Trio
 Don Harris Psycho-Cop

References

Sources
 Radio interview with Helmut Rellergerd, 2006.
 Interview with Jason Dark

External links 
 
 John Sinclair's First Case: How It All Began (short novel by Jason Dark)
 The Night of the Necromancer (horror novel by Jason Dark)
Interview with Jason Dark (German language)
 Interview 2005
 Portrait of Helmut Rellergerd in: Focus

German fantasy writers
Living people
1945 births
20th-century German male writers
21st-century German male writers